Astérix et Cléopâtre may refer to:
 Asterix and Cleopatra, a 1963 French comic book starring Asterix
 Asterix and Cleopatra (film), a 1968 animated film based on that comic